Bresegard bei Picher is a small municipality in the German state of Mecklenburg-Vorpommern.  Often it is simply referred to simply as Bresegard.  There is another municipality within Mecklenburg also called Bresegard and to differentiate the two 'bei Picher' is added, signifying a close proximity to the town of Picher. The other Bresegard is near the town of Eldena and is called Bresegard bei Eldena.  Bresegard bei Picher, part of the Amt of Hagenow-Land and the district (Landkreis) of Ludwigslust, is near the main highway between Berlin and Hamburg.

History

This area of Germany (Mecklenburg) had once been inhabited by Slavic peoples, and the suffix 'gard' in the name Bresegard reflects this.  The place name, originally from the Slavic, later as 'Birkenbirge', and finally as Bresegard, had the root meaning of "birch tree mountain".  The Bresegard crest depicts a birch tree on a mound, the seed pods represent the number of roads leading into the village.

The first known mention of Bresegard was in 1421 by Albrecht V. of Mecklenburg-Schwerin, in his compilation of land ownership, and was known then as "Brezegure".  There are some indications that in the 15th and 16th centuries there may have been windmills in place.  During the Thirty Years War much of the area surrounding Bresegard was devastated.  By the 17th and 18th centuries small farmers began to populate the area.

Bresegard bei Picher was part of the area initially captured or occupied by American troops at the end of World War II.  Bresegard was on the American side of the line of contact between American and Soviet forces.  Due to previous agreements by the Allied powers, this part of Germany was transferred to Soviet control several weeks after American occupation.  As a small remote village, Bresegard did not suffer wartime destruction.

References

Ludwigslust-Parchim